The Dufour River (in French: rivière Dufour) is a tributary of the east bank of the Kamouraska River, which empties on the south bank of the Saint Lawrence river two km east of the center of the village of Kamouraska.

The Dufour river flows in the municipalities of Saint-Philippe-de-Néri and Saint-Pascal, in the Kamouraska Regional County Municipality, in the administrative region of Bas-Saint-Laurent, in province of Quebec, in Canada.

Geography 
The Commission de toponymie du Québec assigns the status of a stream to this watercourse.

  north-east in Saint-Philippe-de-Néri, to the limit of Saint-Pascal;
  north-east in Saint-Pascal collecting water from the Creux streams (coming from the south and drawing its source at Lake Saint-Pierre), up to the Beaulieu road;
  north, to its confluence which is connected (on the southeast side) to the autoroute 20 bridge.

Toponymy 
The term "Dufour" constitutes a French Canadian surname.

The toponym “Rivière Dufour” was formalized on June 29, 1983, by the Commission de toponymie du Québec.

See also 

 List of rivers of Quebec

References 

Rivers of Bas-Saint-Laurent